Nabak-kimchi is a watery kimchi, similar to dongchimi, in Korean cuisine. It is made of Korean radish and napa cabbage (called baechu, hangul 배추, in Korean) as main ingredients, thinly sliced into rectangular shapes, salted and mixed with vegetables and spices such as cucumber, scallion, Java water dropwort (called "minari", 미나리 in Korean), garlic, ginger, red chilies, chili pepper powder, sugar, salt, and water.

Nabak gimchi looks similar to dongchimi in form but is commonly consumed during spring and summer, whereas dongchimi is most commonly eaten in winter. Chili pepper powder is added to make nabak kimchi, resulting in a rose pink color as opposed to the white-colored dongchimi.

The term nabak originated from nabaknabak (나박나박) which is a Korean adverb for "making flattened" or "slicing thinly".

See also 
 Korean radish

References

External links 

 Brief information and recipe about nabak kimchi
 Brief information about nabak kimchi and other kimchi from Korea Tourism Organization
  Recipe of nabak kimchi from the Munhwa Ilbo newspaper's Kimchi EXPO 2007
  General information and recipe about nabak kimchi

Kimchi
Spring (season)
Summer